Kho-Kho may refer to:
 Kho kho, a traditional Indian sport
 Kho-Kho (2013 film), an Indian Marathi-language film
 Kho-Kho (2021 film), an Indian Malayalam-language sports drama film